Michalis Agrimakis (born 29 July 1992) is a Greek professional footballer who plays as a goalkeeper for Super League 2 club Kifisia.

References

1992 births
Living people
Greek footballers
Greek expatriate footballers
Super League Greece players
Football League (Greece) players
Gamma Ethniki players
OFI Crete F.C. players
PGS Kissamikos players
Panelefsiniakos F.C. players
PAEEK players
Digenis Akritas Morphou FC players
Olympiakos Nicosia players
Association football goalkeepers
Footballers from Rethymno
Olympiacos F.C. players